Kim Na-young (born 6 January 1988, Gyeongsangbuk, South Korea) is a South Korean judoka. She won a bronze medal at the +78 kg category of the 2006 Asian Games. In the same weight category she finished 5th at the 2008 Olympics.  She beat Nihel Cheikh Rouhou in the quarterfinal, before losing to Tong Wen in the semifinal.  Because Tong reached the final, Kim entered the repechage, where she beat Tea Donguzashvili and Samah Ramadan, before losing her bronze medal match to Lucija Polavder.

At the 2012 Summer Olympics, she lost her first match to Gulzhan Isanova.

References

External links

 
 
 

1988 births
Living people
Judoka at the 2008 Summer Olympics
Judoka at the 2012 Summer Olympics
Olympic judoka of South Korea
Asian Games medalists in judo
Judoka at the 2006 Asian Games
Judoka at the 2010 Asian Games
South Korean female judoka
Asian Games silver medalists for South Korea
Asian Games bronze medalists for South Korea
Medalists at the 2006 Asian Games
Medalists at the 2010 Asian Games
Sportspeople from North Gyeongsang Province
Universiade medalists in judo
Universiade silver medalists for South Korea
Medalists at the 2011 Summer Universiade
21st-century South Korean women